John P. Kelly is the debut solo album from member of The Lost Boyz and rapper Mr. Cheeks. It contains the hit single "Lights, Camera, Action!".

Track listing 
"Radio Intro"
Produced by Mr. Cheeks
"Lights, Camera, Action!"
Produced by Bink!
"Mama Say" (featuring Stephen Marley)
Produced by Stephen Marley
Co-produced by DJ Sage
"Friday Night" (featuring Horace Brown)
Produced by Mr. Sexxx
"Here We Come"
Produced by Easy Mo Bee
"Bump Heads" (featuring Big Gipp)
Produced by Mr. Sexxx
"Worldwide Bouncin'"
Produced by Mr. Sexxx
"What the Fuck Is This"
Produced by Caspa/Dejah
"Till We Meet Again" (featuring Stephen Marley)
Produced by Stephen Marley
"I Remember"
Produced by J.J. Brown
"Let's Go"
Produced by Rated R N Mas 12
"Fuckin' with Walt"
Produced by Terence Dudley
"Unanimous Decision"
Produced by DJ Sage
"Major"
Produced by Mr. Sexxx

References

Mr. Cheeks albums
2001 debut albums
Universal Records albums
Albums produced by Bink (record producer)
Albums produced by Easy Mo Bee